Sergio Ezequiel Velázquez (born 12 September 1990) is an Argentine footballer that plays as right back.

Career

Club
Velázquez's career began in 2010 with Primera B Nacional side Defensa y Justicia, he made his debut for the team on 19 September against Boca Unidos. Fifty appearances followed over the next three seasons for Velázquez. 2013 saw Velázquez leave on loan to join Chilean Primera División club Universidad de Chile, he played eight league matches and won the 2012–13 Copa Chile before returning to Argentina. Shortly after returning, he was loaned out to Huracán of Primera B Nacional. He made nine appearances during the 2013–14 Primera B Nacional season and won the 2013–14 Copa Argentina before going back to Defensa y Justicia and subsequently earning promotion after finishing second in the 2013–14 Primera B Nacional.

Velázquez left Defensa y Justicia permanently in the middle of 2014 as he agreed to join Argentine Primera División side Godoy Cruz, but his spell with Godoy Cruz was short as he departed six months later to join fellow Primera División club Gimnasia y Esgrima after just seven appearances. He was released by Gimnasia y Esgrima in January 2016 after only four appearances. He was without a club for the 2016 Argentine Primera División season before joining Arsenal de Sarandí ahead of the 2016–17 Argentine Primera División season.

Career statistics

Club
.

Honours

Club
Universidad de Chile
 Copa Chile (1): 2012–13

Huracán
 Copa Argentina (1): 2013–14

References

External links

Velázquez profile at Football.com

1990 births
Living people
Argentine footballers
Association football fullbacks
Argentine expatriate footballers
Expatriate footballers in Chile
Defensa y Justicia footballers
Universidad de Chile footballers
Club Atlético Huracán footballers
Godoy Cruz Antonio Tomba footballers
Club de Gimnasia y Esgrima La Plata footballers
Arsenal de Sarandí footballers
Gimnasia y Esgrima de Mendoza footballers
Primera Nacional players
Chilean Primera División players
Argentine Primera División players
People from Quilmes
Sportspeople from Buenos Aires Province